Jan Gawroński (born 9 June 1933) is a Polish footballer. He played in three matches for the Poland national football team from 1957 to 1959.

References

External links
 

1933 births
Living people
Polish footballers
Poland international footballers
Association football forwards
People from Otwock